White Sulphur Springs is an unincorporated community in Marion Township, Pike County, in the U.S. state of Indiana.

History
An old variant name of the community was called Fidelity. A post office called Fidelity was established in 1871, and remained in operation until it closed in 1884. White sulphur springs were relatively frequent in this area.

Geography

References

Unincorporated communities in Pike County, Indiana
Unincorporated communities in Indiana